Raggedy Man may refer to:

 Raggedy Man, a 1981 American drama film starring Eric Roberts and Sissy Spacek
 Raggedy Man, a name for The Doctor starting in The Eleventh Hour (Doctor Who)
 The Raggedy Man, an 1890 children's book by James Whitcomb Riley